The 2021–22 Botola Pro, also known as Botola Pro Inwi for sponsorship reasons, is the 65th season of the Premier League and the 11th under its new format of Moroccan Pro League, the top Moroccan professional league for association football clubs, since its establishment in 1956.

Wydad Casablanca came into the season as defending champions of the 2020–21 season. Olympique Khouribga and Jeunesse Soualem entered as the two promoted teams from the 2020–21 Botola 2.

The season began in September, 10th 2021 and ended in July, 5th 2022.

Wydad AC are crowned champions of this edition with a record of 22 Botola.

Teams

Stadium and locations

Number of teams by regions

Personnel and kits 

1. On the back of shirt.
2. On the sleeves.
3. On the shorts.  
Additionally, referee kits are made by Puma.

Managerial changes

Foreign players 
All teams are allowed to register up to five foreign players, but can only use up to three players on the field at the same time.

Players name in bold indicates the player is registered during the mid-season transfer window.

League table

Results

Positions by round
The table lists the positions of teams after each week of matches.

Season statistics

Top goalscorers

Top assists

Hat-tricks

(H) – Home ; (A) – Away
4 – Player scored four goals.

Clean Sheets

Goals-to-Games Ratio

Scoring
First goal of the season:
  Houssine Rahimi for Raja Casablanca against Youssoufia Berrechid (10 September 2021)
Last goal of the season:
 Brahim El Bahraoui for Nahdat Berkane against Youssoufia Berrechid (4 July 2022)

Discipline

Player 
 Most yellow cards: 9
  Marouane Louadni (RC Oued Zem)
  Mehdi Attouchi (OC Safi)
  Ayman El Hassouni (Wydad AC)
 Most red cards: 3
  Mohamed El Jaaouani (DH Jadidi)

Club 
 Most yellow cards: 77
 JS Soualem
 Most red cards: 7
 DH Jadidi
 Fewest yellow cards: 38
 SCC Mohammédia
 Fewest red cards: 0
 SCC Mohammédia
 Maghreb AS

Annual awards 
The UMFP (Union Marocaine des Footballeurs Professionnels), in partnership with the Royal Moroccan Football Federation, organized the Night of Stars Award in its 8th edition, which celebrated the brilliants of the Botola Pro for the 2021/22 season.

See also
2021–22 Botola 2
2021–22 CAF Champions League
2021–22 CAF Confederation Cup
2021–22 Moroccan Amateur National Championship
2020–21 Moroccan Throne Cup

References

External links 
frmf.ma

Morocco
Botola seasons
Botola
Botola